Clates Creek is a stream in Franklin County in the U.S. state of Missouri. It is a tributary of the Bourbeuse River.

Clates Creek has the name of a pioneer citizen.

See also
List of rivers of Missouri

References

Rivers of Franklin County, Missouri
Rivers of Missouri